Jelly beans are small bean-shaped sugar candies with soft candy shells and thick gel interiors (see gelatin and jelly). The confection is primarily made of sugar and sold in a wide variety of colors and flavors.

History 
It has been claimed that jelly beans were first mentioned during 1861, when Boston confectioner William Schraff urged people to send his jelly beans to soldiers during the American Civil War. It was not until July 5, 1905, that jelly beans were mentioned in the Chicago Daily News. The advertisement publicized bulk beans sold by volume for ten cents per pound, according to the book The Century in Food: America's Fads and Favorites. Most historians contend that jelly beans were first associated with celebrations of Easter in the United States sometime during the 1930s due to their egg-like shape.

Manufacture 
The basic ingredients of jelly beans include sugar, tapioca or corn syrup, and pectin or starch. Relatively minor amounts of the emulsifying agent lecithin, anti-foaming agents, an edible wax such as carnauba wax or beeswax, salt, and confectioner's glaze are also included. The ingredients that give each bean its character are also relatively small in proportion and may vary depending on the flavor.

Slang 

In United States slang during the 1910s and early 1920s, a "jellybean" or "jelly-bean" was a young man who dressed stylishly but had little else to recommend him, similar to the older terms dandy and fop.   F. Scott Fitzgerald published a story about such a character, The Jelly-Bean, during 1920.

In popular culture

When Beatlemania broke out in 1964, fans of the Beatles in the US pelted the band with jelly beans (emulating fans in the UK who threw the British candy Jelly Babies at George Harrison, who reportedly liked eating them).

President Ronald Reagan's favorite treat was jelly beans.

See also 
 Starch mogul
 Dragée
 Gummy bears
 Skittles (candy)
 Turkish delight
 Nerds (candy)
 Jelly babies
 Jujube (confectionery)
 Gumdrop
 Mint (candy)
 Jelly (preserves)
 Jelly (dessert)
Jelly bean rule

References

External links
 

American inventions
Confectionery
Easter food